Joan Freeman may refer to:

Joan Freeman (actress) (born 1941), American actress
Joan Freeman (British psychologist)
Joan Freeman (politician) (born 1958), Member of the 25th Seanad
Joan Maie Freeman (1918–1998), Australian physicist